James Marshall may refer to:

James W. Marshall (1810–1885), discovered gold in California in 1848
Sir James Marshall (1829–1889), British colonial judge 
 James G. Marshall (ca. 1852-1891), Mississippi legislator
James Marshall (VC) (1887–1918), Victoria Cross recipient
James Marshall (director) (born 1962), American television producer and director
James Marshall (author) (1942–1992), American author of children's books
James Marshall (footballer, born 1893), Scottish footballer (Bradford City)
James Marshall (footballer, born 1908) (1908–1977), Scottish footballer (Rangers, Arsenal, national team)
James Marshall (actor) (born 1967), American actor
James Marshall (cricketer) (born 1979), New Zealand cricketer
James Marshall (merchant) James Waddell Marshall (1845–1925), of South Australia
James Marshall (minister) (1796–1855), Scottish minister, of the Church of Scotland, and from 1841 of the Church of England
James Marshall (politician) (1843–1912), member of the New Zealand Legislative Council
James Marshall (rugby union) (born 1988), New Zealand rugby player
James Duard Marshall (1914-2010), American painter
James William Marshall (1822–1910), US Postmaster General
James William Marshall (politician) (1844–1911), US Congressman from Virginia
James Garth Marshall (1802–1873), Member of Parliament for Leeds
James Alexander Marshall (1888–1977), Canadian federal politician
James C. Marshall (1897–1977), American military engineer, first head of the Manhattan Engineer District
James S. Marshall (1819–1892), Mayor of Green Bay, Wisconsin
James K. Marshall (1839–1863), Confederate Army officer during the American Civil War
James Markham Marshall (1764–1848), United States federal judge
James Marshall (political adviser), British political advisor
James Marshall (producer), British television producer
James Keith Marshall (1817–1862), Virginia planter and politician
James Thompson Marshall (1854–1931), English railway and mechanical engineer
Dalek (artist) (born 1968), real name James Marshall, US artist
President James Marshall, fictional character played by Harrison Ford in 1997 film Air Force One

See also
Jim Marshall (disambiguation)